Eyes Without a Face can refer to:
Eyes Without a Face (film), (French: Les yeux sans visage), 1960 French-language horror film
"Eyes Without a Face" (song), 1984 Billy Idol song